Betanzos Club de Fútbol is a football team based in Betanzos in the autonomous community of Galicia. Founded in 1952, it plays in the Tercera División – Group 1. Its stadium is Estadio García Hermanos with a capacity of 5,000 seats.

Season to season

26 seasons in Tercera División

External links
Futbolme team profile 

Football clubs in Galicia (Spain)
Association football clubs established in 1952
1952 establishments in Spain